Arnold I of Egmond, in Dutch Arnoud, Arend, or Arent van Egmond, ( – 9 April 1409) was Lord of Egmond and IJsselstein.

He was the son of John I of Egmond and his wife, Guida of IJsselstein. From 1372, he was a member of the ministerial council of Albert of Bavaria. In 1394 he founded a Cistercian monastery outside the walls of IJsselstein. In Egmond aan den Hoef he renovated the chapel at the ancestral castle, surrounded the castle with a moat, and had a canal dug to connect it with Alkmaar. In 1396, he participated in the military campaign in West Friesland. In 1398, he was enfeoffed with the Lordships of Ameland and De Bilt. He was commander of the Dutch troops who were tasked with stabilizing Frisia. There was a dispute with Count William VI of Holland, because Arnold supported the Cod side in the Hook and Cod wars.
Arnold died at the age of 72 and was buried in the monastery at IJsselstein.

Arnold married Jolanthe of Leiningen (d. 24 April 1434, the daughter of Frederick VII of Leiningen-Dagsburg and Jolanthe of Gulik). They had two surviving sons:
 John II (–1451), his successor
 William (–1451)

References 

 Melis Stoke, Hollandsche cronyk
 Johannes a Leydis, written between 1477 and 1484, translated by Kornelis van Herk
 Willem Procurator, Kroniek, Uitgeverij Verloren, Hilversum, 2001

1330s births
1409 deaths
Arnold 01
Lords of IJsselstein
People from Egmond
14th-century people of the Holy Roman Empire
15th-century people of the Holy Roman Empire